Lahmansville is an unincorporated community on Patterson Creek in Grant County, West Virginia, United States, located along West Virginia Secondary Route 5 at its junction with Secondary Route 5/6.

The community was named after Jacob "Jake" Lahman, a local merchant. According to the Geographic Names Information System, it has also been known as "Laymensville", "Lehmansville" and "Leymansville".

References

Unincorporated communities in Grant County, West Virginia
Unincorporated communities in West Virginia